The Cassiar River is a tributary of the Turnagain River in far northern British Columbia, flowing north to join the latter river southeast of Cry Lake.  Its name is a reference to the Cassiar Land District, which it flows through the middle of and was the setting of the Cassiar Gold Rush of the 1870s.

See also
Cassiar (disambiguation)
List of rivers of British Columbia

References

Rivers of British Columbia
Cassiar Country